The Ven Edward Berens, a Fellow of Oriel College, Oxford, and son in law of the Bishop of Exeter, was Archdeacon of Berkshire from 1832 until  1855.

References

External links
 
 

Fellows of Oriel College, Oxford
Archdeacons of Berkshire